Uroš Nenadović (Serbian Cyrillic: Урош Ненадовић; born 28 January 1994) is a Serbian footballer who plays for Alashkert in the Armenian Premier League.

Career
In September 2019, Nenadović left AC Horsens after less than a month with the club.

On 23 January 2020, Nenadović signed for Shirak SC.

On 24 June 2021, Ararat Yerevan announced the departure of Nenadović.

On 26 June 2021, Taraz announced the signing of Nenadović.

On 22 January 2022, Nenadović signed for FC Pyunik. On 27 December 2022, Pyunik announced that Nenadović would be leaving the club. 

On 21 January 2023, Alashkert announced the return of Nenadović.

Career statistics

Club

Honours
Pyunik
 Armenian Premier League: 2021–22

References

External links
 
 Uroš Nenadović stats at utakmica.rs 
 

1994 births
Living people
Association football forwards
Footballers from Belgrade
Serbian footballers
OFK Beograd players
RFK Novi Sad 1921 players
FK Novi Pazar players
FK Vojvodina players
FK Rad players
FK Radnik Surdulica players
FC Alashkert players
AC Horsens players
FC Shirak players
FC Ararat Yerevan players
FC Taraz players
Serbian First League players
Serbian SuperLiga players
Armenian Premier League players
Serbian expatriate sportspeople in Armenia
Expatriate footballers in Armenia
Serbian expatriate sportspeople in Denmark
Expatriate men's footballers in Denmark
Serbian expatriate sportspeople in Kazakhstan
Expatriate footballers in Kazakhstan